Basilides (Greek: Βασιλείδης) was an early Christian Gnostic religious teacher in Alexandria, Egypt who taught from 117 to 138 AD, and claimed to have inherited his teachings from the apostle Saint Matthias. He was a pupil of either the Simonian teacher Menander, or a supposed disciple of Peter named Glaucias. The Acts of the Disputation with Manes state that for a time he taught among the Persians. According to Agapius of Hierapolis he appeared in the 15th year of Trajan reign (113 AD). He is believed to have written over two dozen books of commentary on the Christian Gospel (now all lost) entitled Exegetica, making him one of the earliest Gospel commentators.

The followers of Basilides, the Basilidians, formed a movement that persisted for at least two centuries after him – Epiphanius of Salamis, at the end of the 4th century, recognized a persistent Basilidian Gnosis in Egypt. It is probable, however, that the school melded into the mainstream of Gnosticism by the latter half of the 2nd century.

Doctrine

Creation
The descriptions of the Basilidian system given by our chief informants, Irenaeus (in his Adversus Haereses) and Hippolytus (in his Philosophumena), are so strongly divergent that they seem to many quite irreconcilable. According to Hippolytus, Basilides was apparently a pantheistic evolutionist; and according to Irenaeus, a dualist and an emanationist.

His view of creation, according to the orthodox heresiologists, was likely similar to that of Valentinus, whom he rivaled, being based on a "doctrine of emanations" proceeding from an uncreated, ineffable Pleroma. Like his rival, Basilides taught that matter, and the material universe, are evil, and that the God of the Old Testament, who was responsible for creation, is a misguided archon or lesser deity.

Historians, such as Philip Shaff, have the opinion that: "Irenaeus described a form of Basilideanism which was not the original, but a later corruption of the system. On the other hand, Clement of Alexandria surely, and Hippolytus, in the fuller account of his Philosophumena, probably drew their knowledge of the system directly from Basilides' own work, the Exegetica, and hence represent the form of doctrine taught by Basilides himself".

Faith and Election
Like other gnostics, Basilides taught that salvation comes through knowledge and not faith.<ref>Louis P. Pojman, "Basilides," in The Cambridge Dictionary of Philosophy," 3rd ed., ed. Robert Audi.</ref> This knowledge, or gnosis, was considered esoteric, a revelation to human beings by the divine being, Jesus Christ. Faith played no part in salvation. Indeed, Basilides believed faith was merely "an assent of the soul to any of the things which do not excite sensation, because they are not present". He also believed faith was a matter of "nature," not of conscious choice, so that men would "discover doctrines without demonstration by an intellective apprehension". Basilides also appears to have accumulated forms of dignity in accordance with ones' faith.

Because Basilides believed faith was a matter of nature, doubtlessly he pushed election so far as to sever a portion of mankind from the rest, as alone entitled by Divine decree to receive a higher enlightenment. In this sense it must have been that he called "the elect a stranger to the world, as being by nature supermundane".

Biblical canon
The canon of Basilides had its own Gospel alongside the Gospel of John, rejected the Epistle of Titus (this section is incomplete).

Metempsychosis
Basilides likewise brought in the notion of sin in a past stage of existence suffering its penalty here, "the elect soul" suffering "honourably through martyrdom, and the soul of another kind being cleansed by an appropriate punishment." To this doctrine of metempsychosis the Basilidians are likewise said to have referred the language of the Lord about requital to the third and fourth generations; Origen states that Basilides himself interpreted  in this sense,

However, if there be any who suffers without previous sin, it will not be "by the design of an [adverse] power", but as suffers the babe who appears to have committed no sin. The infant is said to receive a benefit when it is subjected to suffering, "gaining" many hardships.

Hell
Origen complained that Basilides deprived men of a salutary fear by teaching that transmigrations are the only punishments after death.

Martyrdom
Because Basilides held to a fatalistic view of metempsychosis, he believed the Christian martyrs were being punished not for being Christians, but for sins they had committed in the past. This is why Origen says that he depreciated the martyrs.

Passions
The Basilideans were accustomed to call the passions Appendages, stating that these are certain spirits that append (προσηρτημένα) themselves to rational souls in a certain primitive turmoil and confusion. Then, they imitate the actions of those they are appended to, and not only acquire the impulses of the irrational animals, but even imitate the movements and beauties of plants. These Appendages can also have characteristics of habit [derived from stones], as the hardness of a diamond.

It is impossible to determine the precise origin of this singular theory, but it was probably connected with the doctrine of metempsychosis, which seemed to find support in Plato's Timaeus. St. Clement of Alexandria stated that the plurality of souls makes the body a Trojan horse.

Practices

Marriage
Reciting the views of different heretics on marriage, Clement gives specimens of the teaching of Basilides and his son Isidore, by way of rebuke to the immorality of the later Basilidians.

Epiphany
Although we have no evidence that Basilides, like some others, regarded Jesus's Baptism as the time when a Divine being first was joined to Jesus of Nazareth, it seems clear that he attached some unusual significance to the event. St. Hippolytus of Rome implied that Basilides regarded the Baptism as the occasion when Jesus received "the Gospel" by a Divine illumination.

"They of Basilides," says Clement, "celebrate the day of His Baptism by a preliminary night-service of [Scripture] readings." The Venice MS. states that the Basilideans celebrated the night before the Epiphany singing and flute-playing in a heathen temple at Alexandria: so that probably the Basilidian rite was a modification of an old local custom.

Meat offered to idols and apostasy
Eusebius of Caesarea is quoting Agrippa Castor, when he states that Basilides: "taught also that the eating of meat offered to idols and the unguarded renunciation of the faith in times of persecution were matters of indifference". However, from St. Clement of Alexandria's Stromata, it appears that Agrippa Castor misunderstood the purpose of Basilides's argument, partly from the actual doctrine and practices of later Basilidians; but it may also have had some justification in incidental words which have not been preserved. It appears as if Basilides was actually saying that the eating of meat offered to idols and apostasy weren't condemned for immorality, but were punishments because of immorality.

Silence
According to Agrippa Castor, Basilides "in Pythagorean fashion" prescribed a silence of five years to his disciples.

Prophets
Agrippa Castor stated that Basilides "invented prophets for himself named Barcabbas and Barcoph, and others that had no existence". The alleged prophecies apparently belonged to the apocryphal Zoroastrian literature popular with various Gnostics.

Traditions of Matthias
According to Basilides and Isidore, Matthias spoke to them mystical doctrines which he heard in private teaching from the Saviour.Strom. vii. 900.  Origen also and after him Eusebius refer to a "Gospel" of or according to Matthias. The true name was apparently the Traditions of Matthias.

 Acts of the Disputation with Manes 
The writer of Acts held Basilides responsible for dualism, yet his language on this point is loose, as if he were not sure of his ground; and the quotation which he gives by no means bears him out. It is quite conceivable that his understanding of Basilides came from the dualistic Basilidians of his day, who have given a wrong interpretation to genuine words of their master. Indeed the description of evil as a supervenient nature without root, reads almost as if it were directed against Persian doctrine, and may be fairly interpreted by Basilides's comparison of pain and fear to the rust of iron as natural accidents.

The identity of the Basilides of the Acts with the Alexandrian has been denied by Gieseler with some show of reason. It is at least strange that our Basilides should be described simply as a "preacher among the Persians," a character in which he is otherwise unknown; and all the more since he has been previously mentioned with Marcion and Valentinus as a heretic of familiar name. On the other hand, it has been justly urged that the two passages are addressed to different persons. The correspondence is likewise remarkable between the "treatises" in at least thirteen books, with an interpretation of a parable among their contents, and the "twenty-four books on the Gospel" mentioned by Agrippa Castor, called Exegetica by Clement. Thus the evidence for the identity of the two writers may on the whole be treated as preponderating. But the ambiguity of interpretation remains; and it would be impossible to rank Basilides confidently among dualists, even if the passage in the Acts stood alone: much more to use it as a standard by which to force a dualistic interpretation upon other clearer statements of his doctrine.

Isidorus
Hippolytus couples with Basilides "his true child and disciple" Isidore. He is there referring to the use which they made of the Traditions of Matthias; but in the next sentence he treats them as jointly responsible for the doctrines which he recites. Our only other authority respecting Isidore is Clement (copied by Theodoret), who calls him in like manner "at once son and disciple" of Basilides.

Expositions of the Prophet Parchor
Isidore's Expositions of the Prophet Parchor taught the higher thoughts of heathen philosophers and mythologers were derived from Jewish sources. So, by quoting the philosopher Pherecydes, who had probably a peculiar interest for Isidore as the earliest promulgator of the doctrine of metempsychosis known to tradition, Isidore was proving his validity as a descendant of the prophets.

Isidore's allegation that Pherecydes followed "the prophecy of Ham" was also used to claim that the apocryphal Zoroastrian books had quasi-biblical sanctity as proceeding from Zoroaster, a son of Noah; so Isidore gladly accepted the theory as evidence for his argument.

On an Adherent Soul
In his book On an Adherent Soul, Isidore appears to have argued against his father's teaching on "Appendages". He insists on the unity of the soul, and maintains that bad men will find "no common excuse" in the violence of the "appendages" for pleading that their evil acts were involuntary: "our duty is", he says, "by overcoming the inferior creation within us through the reasoning faculty, to show ourselves to have the mastery".

Ethics
A passage from Isidore's Ethics says: "Abstain, then, from a quarrelsome woman lest you are distracted from the grace of God. But when you have rejected the fire of the seed, then pray with an undisturbed conscience. And when your prayer of thanksgiving," he says, "descends to a prayer of request, and your request is not that in future you may do right, but that you may do no wrong, then marry."

Legacy
Gnosticism was throughout eclectic, and Basilides superadded an eclecticism of his own. Antecedent Gnosticism, Greek philosophy, and the Christian faith and Scriptures all exercised a powerful and immediate influence over his mind. It is evident at a glance that his system is far removed from any known form of Syrian or original Gnosticism. Like that of Valentinus, it has been remoulded in a Greek spirit, but much more completely.

Ancient writers usually name Basilides before Valentinus; but there is little doubt that they were at least approximately contemporaries, and it is not unlikely that Valentinus was best known personally from his sojourn at Rome, which was probably the last of the recorded stages of his life. There is at all events no serious chronological difficulty in supposing that the Valentinian system was the starting-point from which Basilides proceeded to construct by contrast his own theory, and this is the view which a comparison of doctrines suggests.

In no point, unless it be the retention of the widely spread term archon, is Basilides nearer than Valentinus to the older Gnosticism, while several leading Gnostic forms or ideas which he discards or even repudiates are held fast by Valentinus. Such are descent from above, putting forth or pullulation, syzygies of male and female powers, and the deposition of faith to a lower level than knowledge. Further, the unique name given by Basilides to the Holy Spirit, "the Limitary (μεθόριον) Spirit," together with the place assigned to it, can hardly be anything else than a transformation of the strange Valentinian "Limit".

The same softening of oppositions which retain much of their force even with Valentinus shows itself in other instances, as of matter and spirit, creation and redemption, the Jewish age and the Christian age, the earthly and the heavenly elements in the Person of Jesus. The strongest impulse in this direction probably came from Christian ideas.

An antecedent matter was expressly repudiated, the words of  eagerly appropriated, and a Divine counsel represented as foreordaining all future growths and processes; yet the chaotic nullity out of which the developed universe was to spring was attributed with equal boldness to its Maker: Creator and creation were not confused, but they melted away in the distance together. Nature was accepted not only as prescribing the conditions of the lower life, but as practically the supreme and permanent arbiter of destiny. Thus though faith regained its rights, it remained an energy of the understanding, confined to those who had the requisite inborn capacity; while the dealings of God with man were shut up within the lines of mechanical justice.

Popularity
Basilides had to all appearance no eminent disciple except his own son. Although Basilides is mentioned by all the Church Fathers as one of the chiefs of Gnosticism, the system of Valentinus seems to have been much more popular and wider spread, as was also Marcionism.

Influence
20th-century psychoanalyst Carl Jung wrote his Seven Sermons to the Dead and attributed them to Basilides. The Argentine writer Jorge Luis Borges was interested in Irenaeus' account of Basilides' Gnostic doctrine and wrote an essay on the subject:  "A Vindication of the False Basilides" (1932). Basilides' Gnostic Gospel is one of the books mentioned in Borges's short story "The Library of Babel" (1941). Basilides also appears in Borges' "Three Versions of Judas" (1944), which opens with the striking passage: "In Asia Minor or in Alexandria, in the second century of our faith, when Basilides published that the Cosmos was a reckless or evil improvisation by deficient angels...".

Sources

Church Fathers
Historians know of Basilides and his teachings mainly through the writings of his detractors, and it is impossible to determine how reliable these accounts are. The oldest refutation of the teachings of Basilides, by Agrippa Castor, is lost, and we are dependent upon the later accounts of:
Eusebius of Caesarea, Ecclesiastical History, Book IV, Chapter vii, written around the 4th century.
St. Clement of Alexandria, Stromata, Book I, Chapter xxi; Book II, Chapters vi, viii, and xx; Book IV, Chapters xi, xii, and xxv; Book V, Chapter I, etc., written between 208 and 210, and the so-called Excerpta ex Theodoto perhaps from the same hand.
St. Hippolytus of Rome, Philosophumena, Book VII, written about 225.
Pseudo-Tertullian, Against All Heresies, a little treatise usually attached to Tertullian's De Praescriptionibus, but really by another hand, perhaps by Victorinus of Pettau, written about 240 and based upon a non-extant "Compendium" of St. Hippolytus.
St. Epiphanius of Salamis, Panarion, Book I, Sect xxiv.
Theodoret of Cyrus, Compendium of Heretical Accounts, Book I, Chapter iv.

Writings of Basilides
Nearly everything Basilides wrote has been lost, but the names of three of his works and fragments are available in the present day:
Fragments of the Exegetica are available from St. Clement of Alexandria in his Stromata, Book IV, Chapter 12, and from Archelaus in his Acts of the Disputation with Manes, Chapter 55, and probably also from Origen in his Commentary on Romans V, Book I.
Origen states that  "Basilides had even the audacity to write a Gospel according to Basilides", and both St. Jerome and St. Ambrose repeat Origen. Yet no trace of a Gospel by Basilides exists elsewhere; and it is possible either that Origen misunderstood the nature of the Exegetica, or that the Gospel was known under another name.
Origen in a note on Job, xxi, 1 sqq., speaks of "Odes" of Basilides.

Other works
Some fragments are known through the work of Clement of Alexandria:
 The Octet of Subsistent Entities (Fragment A)
 The Uniqueness of the World (Fragment B)
 Election Naturally Entails Faith and Virtue (Fragment C)
 The State of Virtue (Fragment D)
 The Elect Transcend the World (Fragment E)
 Reincarnation (Fragment F)
 Human Suffering and the Goodness of Providence (Fragment G)
 Forgivable Sins (Fragment H)

A book called Acts of the Disputation with Manes, which was written during the close of the 3rd century or later, speaks about the Basilidean origins of Manichaeism.

Artifacts
Artistic remains of Gnosticism such as Abrasax gems, and literary remains like the Pistis Sophia, the latter part of which probably dates back to the end of the 2nd century and, though not strictly Basilidian, yet illustrates early Alexandrian Gnosticism.

 Notes 

References

Bibliography
Attribution

Primary sources

 

Secondary sources

 Biondi, Graziano, Basilide. La filosofia del Dio inesistente, Roma 2005, pp.384
Buonaiuti, Lo Gnosticismo (Rome, 1907)
Duchesne, Hist. ancienne de l'Eglise (3d ed., Paris, 1907), I, xi, s.v. La Gnose et le MarcionismeBareille in Dict. de theol. Cath., s. vv. Abrasax, BasilideLeclercq, Dict. d'arch. Chret., s.v. AbrasaxBardenhewer, Gesch. der altkirch. Lit. (Freiburg, 1902), I

Mansel, Gnostic HeresiesDe Groot, Basilides als erster Zeuge fur das N. T. (Leipzig, 1868)
Urlhorn, Das Basilidianische System'' (Göttingen, 1855).

External links

"Basilides" by T. Apiryon
Fragments of Basilides
Fragments of his son Isidore
St. Clement of Alexandria's Stromata, Book iv
Archelaus' Acts of the Disputation with Manes see Chapter 55.

Gnostics
2nd-century Egyptian people
2nd-century Christian theologians
Egyptian Christians